Kristin Danielsen is a Norwegian orienteering competitor. She won a silver medal in the relay at the  1974 World Orienteering Championships, and two bronze medals in the 1970 World Orienteering Championships.

References

Year of birth missing (living people)
Living people
Norwegian orienteers
Female orienteers
Foot orienteers
World Orienteering Championships medalists
20th-century Norwegian women